Abadan (also Romanized as Ābādān) is a village in Damen Rural District, in the Central District of Iranshahr County, Sistan and Baluchestan Province, Iran. At the 2006 census, its population was 2,233, in 440 families.

References 

Populated places in Iranshahr County